Protein SEC13 homolog is a protein that in humans is encoded by the SEC13 gene.

The protein encoded by this gene belongs to the SEC13 family of WD-repeat proteins. It has similarity to the yeast SEC13 and SEC31 proteins, which are required for vesicle biogenesis from the endoplasmic reticulum during the transport of proteins.

References

Further reading

Nuclear pore complex